Noakhali Science and Technology University (known as NSTU) is a public university in the coastal terrain Noakhali of Bangladesh. It is the 27th public university (out of 32) and fifth science and technology university in Bangladesh. Its foundation stone was laid on 11 October 2003 and academic activities started on 22 June 2006.

History
Former Prime Minister Begum Khaleda Zia laid the foundation stone of Noakhali Science and Technology University on 11 October 2003. Earlier the Prime Minister Sheikh Hasina took necessary steps to establish this university. At 15 July 2001 her government passed a law in the parliament. Its construction work was formally inaugurated on 24 March 2005. Finally, it started its academic activities on 22 June 2006. It is the fifth of 12 such universities the government decided in 1997 to establish in the 12 erstwhile greater districts where there was no university.

Campus
Noakhali University of Science and Technology stands on Sonapur, 8 kilometers southwest of Maijdee. It has a land area of  covering 93 Salla and 95 Noakhali Mouza. The goal of the university is to make it is one of the top tier universities in Bangladesh. Presently the campus consists of one 5 storied administrative building, three academic buildings (academic 1 is 5 storied and academic 2 and 3 are 10 storied), three male student halls, two female student halls, a 5 storied auditorium and TSC building, one 4 storied library building. The well furnished central library equipped with online library facilities has 10,000 printed books and 1500 printed journals apart from numerous e-books and e-journals. It has also four teacher's and officer's dormitories, one staff dormitories, vice chancellor's building and a mosque as well as a guest house. The construction of NSTU medical centre is also completed. There are two sport field and two big ponds in the campus area. It has a canteen for students called NSTU cafeteria. It has also a martyr monument like a fountain pen and a sculpture of liberation war. A park called Varsity park is also decorated for students leisure time with different kind of trees, benches and an octagonal cafeteria.

Landscape

Residence halls
 Vasha Sahid Abdus Salam Hall (ASH)
 Bangabandhu Sheikh Mujibur Rahman Hall (BSMRH)
 Abdul Malek Ukil Hall (MUH)
 Bibi Khadija Hall (BKH)
 Bangamata Sheikh Fazilatunesa Mujib Hall (BSFMH)

List of vice chancellors

Academic facilities
The university has 29 departments under six faculties and two institutes. The faculties are:
 Faculty of Engineering & Technology
 Faculty of Science
 Faculty of Social Sciences and Humanities
 Faculty of Business Administration
 Faculty of Education Sciences
 Faculty of Law

All above courses are undergraduate and postgraduate levels.

The institutes are:
 Institute of Information Technology
 Institute of Information Sciences
The institutes offer undergraduate and diploma level degrees.

Ranking

Bangladesh ranking 
In the local universities ranking, Noakhali Science and Technology University was placed as 14th overall and multi-disciplinary category out of 136 ranked universities (public and private) and also placed as 2nd science and technology university out of 09 in 2016 while in 2006.

Web ranking 
In 2018, the NSTU was placed as 6271 into the top list of World Universities and placed as 621 into the top list of "South Asian Universities" in the ranking carried out by the web ranking.

International ranking 
In 2011–2012, the Noakhali Science and Technology University made it into the list of "Top World Universities" in the ranking carried out by the ranking agency Times Higher Education and Quacquarelli Symonds, UK. Out of over 30,000 universities around the world, NSTU was placed as 11203.

Co-curricular activities

Coastal Environment Network 
Coastal Environment Network, also known as ("কোয়েন" in Bengali), is a departmental club from the department of Environmental Science and Disaster Management of the Noakhali Science and Technology University (NSTU) that is concerned with various environmental issues. It was established in 2014.
After one year of establishment, it was officially inaugurated by M Wahiduzzaman, Vice Chancellor of the Noakhali Science and Technology University.
The club has celebrated many environmentally days with the coordination of the Department of Environment including World Environment Day. It also organizes various environmental workshops, Olympiads, and programs concerning the recent environmental issues.
The Coastal Environment Network (CoEN) facilitates networking among environmental organizations and others who share its mandate to protect the Earth and promote ecologically sound ways of life. The CoEN works directly with concerned citizens and organizations striving to protect, preserve, and restore the environment.
Its motto is "Move Towards Sustainable Development".

NSTU MODEL UNITED NATIONS ASSOCIATION

NSTUMUNA regularly hosts MUN conferences focusing on diplomacy, leadership & negotiations.

Other:

Some other organisations such as NSTUDS, Royal Economics Club, SILSWA-NSTU, Dhropad, NSTU Adventure Club, Cholo Paltai etc. are working in the campus and beyond.

References

External links

 
 Department of Microbiology  
 University Grants Commission of Bangladesh

Public universities of Bangladesh
Educational institutions established in 2005
Universities of science and technology in Bangladesh
2005 establishments in Bangladesh